KCHA (95.9 FM) is a Full Service formatted broadcast radio station licensed to Charles City, Iowa, serving Charles City and Floyd County, Iowa. KCHA is owned and operated by Coloff Media, LLC..

History 
KCHA was launched in 1971 on 104.9 MHz. The station was required to move to 95.9 in 1976 as a result of an FCC docket to allow additional radio stations in the region.

Transmission Location 
The KCHA tower and transmitter is located at the end of Stony Point Road in Charles City, IA.

Programming

Broadcast Signal 
KCHA's broadcast signal can be heard from Mason City to Decorah and from Austin, MN to Waterloo, IA.

References

External links
Official 95-9 KCHA website

CHA
Variety radio stations in the United States
Radio stations established in 1971
Charles City, Iowa